Marley's Ghost is the spirit of the deceased Jacob Marley who haunts Ebenezer Scrooge in  Charles Dickens' 1843 story A Christmas Carol.

Marley's Ghost may also refer to:

Marley's Ghost (band), from California
Marley's Ghost, 2003 stage play by Jeff Goode
Scrooge, or, Marley's Ghost, 1901 British short film

See also
Marley's Ghosts, British comedy television series